The Bricklayer (Spanish: El albañil) is a 1975 Mexican comedy film directed by José Estrada and starring Vicente Fernández, Manoella Torres and Luis Manuel Pelayo.

Cast
 Vicente Fernández as Reinaldo
 Manoella Torres as Manuela Torres
 Luis Manuel Pelayo as Idem
 Dacia González as Enedina
 Alberto Rojas as El Cáncer o El Cancerbero
 Graciela Lara as Mapy
 Orville Miller as Juan Carlos Marotti
 Leandro Martínez
 Agustín Silva
 Juan Ángel Martínez as El Perro, albañil
 Raúl 'Chato' Padilla as Juez
 Liza Willert
 Jorge Fegán as Bermúdez, albañil
 Rafael Valdés as Ingeniero Armando de la Rosa
 Florencio Castelló as Don Agri
 Alfredo Gutiérrez as Maestro Nava
 Juan Garza as Albañil
 Hortensia Santoveña as Monja enfermera
 Arsenio Campos as El del Diners
 Manuel Dondé as Velador

References

Bibliography 
 Ramírez Berg, Charles. Cinema of Solitude: A Critical Study of Mexican Film, 1967-1983. University of Texas Press, 2010.

External links 
 

1975 films
1975 comedy films
Mexican comedy films
1970s Spanish-language films
1970s Mexican films